Madhavnagar is a small city in sangli  and now Suburb of Sangli Urban; Sangli district in the Indian state of Maharashtra.

Demographics
 India census, Madhavnagar had a population of 10,993. Males constitute 51% of the population and females 49%. Madhavnagar has an average literacy rate of 74%, higher than the national average of 59.5%: male literacy is 80%, and female literacy is 67%. In Madhavnagar, 12% of the population is under 6 years of age. It is now the industrial zone in Sangli district. Madhavnagar is one of biggest villages in Miraj Taluka.Many of textile mills are situated in Madhavnagar. It is historical village in Sangli District. Mr. Madhavrao Patvardhan give his name to this village. This is birthplace of Mr. Madan Patil, Ex Minister Govt. of Maharashtra. Shree Devkaran Surajkaran Malu was the first Sarpanch of the Gram panchayat Madhavnagar.
Ranapratap vyayam mandal, Madhavnaagr is popular for sport "kabaddi".

History of madhavnagar
It is just 4 km from Sangli and 12 km from Miraj. Its situated on Sangli - Tasgaon Road. Is this station is outside of village of madhavnagar. Once upon time it was called them 'Maharashtra's Manchester' as same Ichalkaranji, Malegaon.The village have seven prominent colonies on both sides of main road namely Ravivar peth, Somvar peth.... till Shaniwar peth. The village is also hometown for many businessmens' who have cottons and ginning mills and other businesses over the districts.

Rail
Madhavnagar has a railway station. Only passengers are stop at station. It is situated on one of the main rail routes in india.

Notable people
Madhavnagar is the hometown of Indian Women Cricketer Smriti Mandhana.

References

Cities and towns in Sangli district